A Clock Work Blue is a 1972 American sexploitation comedy film directed by Eric Jeffrey Haims. It stars Joe E. Tata as Homer, a clumsy researcher who acquires a watch that allows him to travel through time.

Cast

Release and legal issues
A Clock Work Blue opened in 1972 at the Cinestage Theatre on Dearborn Street in Chicago, Illinois, six days after the film A Clockwork Orange had completed an 18-week run at the nearby Michael Todd Theatre. This, combined with A Clock Work Blues title and the fact that some of its advertising had made references to A Clockwork Orange (such as that the former film "makes Orange blush") resulted in legal action from Warner Bros., the distributor of A Clockwork Orange. The case resulted in Warner Bros. winning a consent order which declared that A Clock Work Blue was not to be screened under that title in any other theater in Cook County, Illinois.

Critical reception
Brian Orndorf of Blu-ray.com called the film "bizarre and relentless with its mediocrity", as well as "screamingly racist".

Home media
In April 2014, A Clock Work Blue was restored in 4K and released on DVD and Blu-ray by Vinegar Syndrome as a double feature with the 1971 film The Jekyll and Hyde Portfolio, also directed by Haims.

References

Bibliography

External links
 

1970s exploitation films
1970s sex comedy films
American sexploitation films
Films about time travel
1972 comedy films
1972 films
1970s English-language films
1970s American films